Any product defined as a drug under the Canadian Food and Drugs Act must have an associated drug identification number (or DIN). A DIN also pertains to veterinary drugs permitted for sale in Canada.

The drug identification number (DIN) is the 8 digit number located on the label of prescription and over-the-counter drug products that have been evaluated by the Therapeutic Products Directorate (TPD) and approved for sale in Canada.

Once a drug has been approved, the Therapeutic Products Directorate issues a DIN, which permits the manufacturer to market the drug in Canada. For drugs, where there is minimal market history in Canada, there is a more stringent review and the drug is required to have a Notice of Compliance and a DIN in order to be marketed in Canada.

A DIN lets the user know that the product has undergone and passed a review of its formulation, labeling, and instructions for use. A drug product sold in Canada without a DIN is not in compliance with Canadian law, with limited exceptions, such as foreign drug products imported under emergency authorization.

The DIN is also a tool to help in the follow-up of products on the market, recall of products, inspections, and quality monitoring. 
A drug product can be looked up via its DIN with the Health Canada's Drug Product Database (DPD) to find specific information of drugs approved by the Ministry.

See also
 National Drug Code 
 Pharmaceutical code

References

External links
Health Canada DIN fact sheet
Drug Product Database (DPD)

Pharmacological classification systems
Pharmacy in Canada
Identifiers